The U.S. Post Office, also known as the Federal Building and Courthouse, is a historic government building in Anniston, Alabama. It was listed on the National Register of Historic Places on November 13, 1976.

Architecture and history
The Beaux-Arts-style building was constructed in 1904-06 and was designed by architects and engineers in the Office of the Supervising Architect under James Knox Taylor. When it was completed it housed courts of the United States District Court for the Northern District of Alabama and the United States Post Office. A major addition was added in 1934, and the post office moved to a different location in 1962. In 2019 construction began at a site on Gurnee Avenue for a new Federal Building, with a design in part derived from the old building.

See also 
List of United States post offices

References 

National Register of Historic Places in Calhoun County, Alabama
Government buildings completed in 1906
Buildings and structures in Anniston, Alabama
Anniston
Beaux-Arts architecture in Alabama